Sandruper See is a lake in Münsterland, North Rhine-Westphalia, Germany. At an elevation of 43 m, its surface area is 11 ha.
It is immediately south of the small town of Sprakel, itself a northern suburb of the city of Münster.

Since 1966, the lake has been managed by the local angling club, VFG Frühauf Münster, who own half the lake.

References 

Lakes of North Rhine-Westphalia